Urban Cookie Collective are a British Eurodance band, best known for their 1993 hit single "The Key the Secret".

History
The band was founded by Rohan Heath (born 19 July 1964), the son of Guyanese writer Roy Heath. He learned to play classical piano as a child before switching to the electric piano. He had previous experience with groups such as Yargo and Manchester DJ A Guy Called Gerald. Heath decided on a music career after abandoning a PhD at the University of Vermont. After a tour of Japan supporting the Happy Mondays, he left the band A Guy Called Gerald to work with the rave band Together. Heath went on to work with Jamaican reggae artist Eek-A-Mouse, before concentrating on his new project, Urban Cookie Collective. He was the keyboardist, writer, and producer of their music.

Heath wrote and produced their first hits, "The Key the Secret" and "Feels Like Heaven". He brought in vocalist Diane Charlemagne for many of the group's early tracks. She eventually co-wrote some of the songs and became a major part of the band. The other main members were Simon Bentall (born 17 October 1967), Peter Samson (born 15 May 1968), Johnny Jay, Mark Hadfield and Neil Claxton (later of Mint Royale). Guest rappers occasionally took part in the studio.

The band caused some controversy in 1996 by recording a cover version of the Oasis song "Champagne Supernova". Noel Gallagher of Oasis, and the writer of the song, claimed that he had not given permission and legal action stopped the track from being given a full release. The band still remains active, and currently tours fronted by singer Danielle Barnett.

In 2014, Charlemagne was diagnosed with kidney cancer. She died of the disease on 28 October 2015, aged 51.

Discography

Studio albums

Compilation albums

Singles

References

External links
Urban Cookie Collective at The Eurodance Encyclopaedia

English dance music groups
British Eurodance groups
Musical groups from Manchester
Year of establishment missing